Queer heterosexuality is heterosexual practice or identity that is also controversially called queer. "Queer heterosexuality" is argued to consist of heterosexual, cisgender, and allosexual persons who show nontraditional gender expressions, or who adopt gender roles that differ from the hegemonic masculinity and femininity of their particular culture.

The concept was first discussed in the mid-1990s, critically within radical feminism, and as a positive identification by Clyde Smith in a paper delivered at a conference in Amsterdam in 1997; in 2003, The Village Voice published an article called, "The Queer Heterosexual", which has since been cited by others using the term.

The idea that any heterosexual can be called "queer" is highly contested. Some in the LGBTQ+ community consider the use of the term "queer" by heterosexual people to be an offensive misappropriation, involving people not experiencing oppression for their sexual orientation or gender identity appropriating aspects of queer identities perceived as "fashionable" or attractive, and disregarding the concurrent oppression experienced by those they appropriate from.

Feminist criticism and queer theory 
Kitzinger and Wilkinson argued that the rehabilitation of heterosexuality through "'queer' heterosexuality" as "a concept derived from postmodernist and queer theory" is seen as flawed from a radical feminist perspective. Acknowledging that 'queer heterosexuality' is rarely explored in detail, they explain that "the notion of the 'queer heterosexual' had become established in queer theory", gaining currency not because people are convinced it is possible or desirable, but "because queer heterosexuality is a necessary component of 'gender-fucking'" in Butlerian terms. 'Queer heterosexuality' becomes named in the project as destabilising all such categories, and moving towards a world where categories such as 'heterosexual' are rendered redundant. The queer theory was created to understand the concepts of gender, besides the binary, male, and female.

In a 2004 paper, Annette Schlichter describes the discourse on queer heterosexuality as aiming at "the de- and possible reconstruction of heterosexual subjectivity through the straight authors' aspiration to identify as queer". In the paper, a genealogy of queer heterosexuality is outlined, pointing out that "The queer critique of sexual normativity is both bound to the history of specific identities and committed to the destabilization of sexual identities—including those that have become hegemonic", while "Critics concerned about issues of lesbian visibility and difference occasionally raise the specter of the queer heterosexual ... as an indication of the queer project's perversion of social and political identities and their relations to power."

Putting to one side the question of whether the idea of homosexual contagion is necessarily homophobic, Guy Davidson uses the article from the Village Voice as an example of how the idea of queer subversion of heterosexuality can have "politically positive implications", specifically in relation to Tristan Taormino's writing on celebration of the LGBT movement's queering of heterosexual sex practices the production of the "queer heterosexual".

In Straight writ queer, the authors acknowledge that the queer heterosexual is only starting to emerge from the closet, seeking in the book to "identify and out the queer heterosexual" in historic and contemporary literature and to identify "inherently queer heterosexual practices" which critique heteronormativity and open up possibilities for the future. The examples in the book include anchorites, the Marquis de Sade and Algernon Charles Swinburne as examples of queer heterosexuals. "Male masochism disavows a masculinity predicated on phallic mastery, and hence becomes a strategic site for queer heterosexual resistance to heteronormativity".

In a 2018 paper, Heather Brook compares how the term 'same-sex marriage' is similarly oxymoronic to 'queer heterosexuality'. They both challenge and connect to essentialist understandings of heterosexuality. However, where 'same-sex marriage' aims to gain social capital from the normativeness of heterosexual marriage, 'queer heterosexuality' pulls on the fluidity of queerness. Brook describes how both terms incite fear of appropriation and the pejoration of a gendered understanding of societal institutions. Specifically, when straight people use 'queer', a term which was reclaimed by the community it now describes, to describe their heterosexuality, it straightens the word within the social consciousness. Brook posits that queer heterosexuality forces an exploration of how heteronormative institutions like marriage can be defined outside of binary oppositions like "hetero and homo; men and women; queer and straight".

Examination of masculinity 
In 2005, Robert Heasley explored queer heterosexuality among a group of men that he identifies as "straight-queer males." According to Heasley, these men are self-identified heterosexuals who do not find social spaces dominated by traditionally masculine personalities to be comfortable. Heasley believes that a lack of understanding of masculinity can be addressed by creating a terminology to describe non-hegemonic masculine behavior. He lists seriously discussing homosexuality, being held or cuddled, hand-holding, dressing femininely, and expressing emotional openness among the behaviors displayed by straight-queer males.

Men who have been surveyed about their "mostly straight" behavior gave various reasons for this self-identification: some felt constrained by traditional models of gender and sexual orientation, others found men attractive. Some had a small amount of sexual interest in men but no desire for romantic same-sex relationships or intercourse, while others felt romantic but not sexual interest in other men.

Controversy 
As 'queer' is generally defined either as a synonym for LGBT, or defined as "non-heterosexual", the term 'queer heterosexual' is considered controversial. Some LGBT people disapprove of the appropriation of 'queer' by cisgender heterosexual individuals, as the term has been used as a slur to oppress LGBT people. Straight celebrities self-identifying as queer have also faced backlash, with some arguing that their identities constitute "playing" with the "fashionable" parts of being LGBT, without having to suffer the resulting oppression of being LGBT, thus trivializing the struggles experienced by queer people. 

Critics of the term compare the use of 'queer heterosexual' to the appropriation engaged in by celebrities like Madonna, who used vogue dancing – a style and subculture originating amongst gay men, particularly African-American and Latino gay men – in her performances, profiting from the use of it while the style's originators did not. Daniel Harris, author of The Rise and Fall of Gay Culture, said that people who call themselves a 'queer heterosexual' "are under the impression they're doing something brave.[...] I'm a little sick that straight men would use those (terms)". Sky Gilbert referred to Calvin Thomas as "a little heterosexual male desperately wishing to be a card-carrying member of the gay community."

Gay reviewer Jameson Fitzpatrick said of James Franco's Straight James / Gay James: "I can't imagine the difficulty of being a straight, cis person who isn't fooled by the foundational fictions of hetero- and cisnormative power structures and doesn't wish to perpetuate them—except to say that I can't imagine that difficulty could possibly be greater than the various violences that many queer people still face today. This might be key to the problem that persists in Franco's claim to queerness, and what about it that rankles so many gay men: a lack of perspective." Fitzpatrick said he knew many people who might qualify as a queer heterosexual, but none who would use the label for themselves, and none who would "flaunt their privilege" as Fitzpatrick viewed Franco as doing in his book. A discussion of Franco and queer heterosexuality by Anthony Moll rejects the idea that Franco's art is queer: "From the concept of the interview between his straight self and his gay selves, to his ham-handed attempt to discuss queer heterosexuality, Franco comes across as a novice queer theorist who is talking through interesting, yet ultimately incomplete, ideas".

See also

 Androgyny
 Cross-dressing
 Effeminacy
 Feminization
 Gender bender
 Gender variance
 Metrosexual
 Non-binary gender
 Sex and gender distinction
 Social construction of gender
 Third gender
 Tomboy
 Two-spirit

References

Further reading 
 Clyde Smith, “How I Became a Queer Heterosexual,” in Calvin Thomas, "Straight with a Twist: Queer Theory and the Subject of Heterosexuality", 60–67 (2000)
 Robert Heasley, "Crossing the Borders of Gendered Sexuality: Queer Masculinities of Straight Men", in Chrys Ingraham, Ed., Thinking Straight: The Power, Promise and Paradox of Heterosexuality (Routledge: UK: 2005 Page 109)
 Eve Kosofsky Sedgwick, Tendencies, Duke University Press (1993)
 Ann Powers, “Queer in the Streets, Straight in the Sheets: Notes on Passing,” Utne Reader, November–December 1993
 Roberta Mock, "Heteroqueer ladies: some performative transactions between gay men and heterosexual women," Feminist Review 75, pp. 20–37 (2003)
 Elizabeth Grosz, “Experimental Desire: Rethinking Queer Subjectivity,” in Supposing the Subject, ed. Joan Copjec, Verso (1994)

Gender identity
Gender roles
Heterosexuality
Queer theory
Cultural appropriation